"TKO" is a song by American pop punk band Motion City Soundtrack. The song was released on June 16, 2015, and was announced the day before its release. The song is the lead single to the band's sixth album, Panic Stations, released in September 2015.

Music
The song, and the album, were recorded in live sessions, instead of recording all the instruments at different times. On the recording of the album and the song itself, Pierre said "A lot of these songs were done in a single take; we’d just pick the best ones. We’d do a take where the drums were great, but the guitar was not, then we’d just redo the guitar, as opposed to everything. It was a whole new approach, and I gotta say that I loved it, especially coming from making records where you’re sitting in the control booth by yourself playing your part over and over and everybody falling asleep."

References

Sharp, Tyler. "Alternative Press." Alternative Press, 16 June 2015. Web. 22 June 2015 
Pettigrew, Jason. "Alternative Press." Alternative Press, 24 September 2014. Web. 22 June 2015. 

Motion City Soundtrack songs
2015 songs
Songs written by Joshua Cain
Songs written by Justin Pierre